IPSC Japan is the Japanese association for practical shooting under the International Practical Shooting Confederation.

External links 
 Official homepage of IPSC Japan

See also 
 IPSC Action Air

References 

Regions of the International Practical Shooting Confederation
Sports organizations of Japan